Leptogenys exudans is a species of ant of the subfamily Ponerinae. It is found in Sri Lanka.

References

Animaldiversity.org
Itis.org

External links

 at antwiki.org

Ponerinae
Hymenoptera of Asia
Insects described in 1859